Demasiado Fuerte is the twenty-fifth (25th) studio album by Puerto Rican singer Yolandita Monge and was produced by José Luis Pagán. It was released in 2007 under her new contract with Univision Music.  The album was featured at Billboard's chart Billboard 200 at the 112 position. Yolandita was nominated for a 2008 Billboard Award and a 2008 GLAAD Award for this record.

The album debuted number one in Billboard Latin Pop Albums making her return to music one of the greatest comebacks ever seen in the Latin Market.  This was her first studio album in over five years and it reinforced her revered status with an exquisite collection of modern ballads that shine the spotlight on her expressive and powerful voice.  Highlights include the lovelorn "La Vida Sin Tu Amor," the dramatic "Cambio De Piel," and the delicate lullaby "Como Una Flor".

The radio hits hits "Y Todavía" and the title track "Demasiado Fuerte" were remixed in reggaeton style and became hits in the urban radio stations in Puerto Rico and the Latin communities in United States.  The CD included a DVD with an exclusive interview, the music video for "Y Todavía" and three songs from the 1989 special Vivencias ("Este Amor Que Hay Que Callar", "Débil", and "Quítame A Ese Hombre Del Corazón").  The album (excluding the videos) is available as a digital download at iTunes and Amazon.

Track listing

Credits and personnel

Vocals: Yolandita Monge
Artistic Direction: Jorge Luis Piloto
Production Coordinator: LaTisha Cotto
Arrangements: José Luis Pagán
Arrangements & Musical Production ('Sentimiento Borincano'): Marlow Rosado
Keyboards & Guitars: José Luis Pagan
Drums: José 'Jota' Morelli
Bass: Guillermo Vadala, José Velázquez
Percussion: Juan Marras, Daniel Berroa
Accordion Néstor Acuña
Trumpets: Ervin Stutz, Julio Díaz
'Cuatro" Guitar: Quique Domenech
Trombone: Néstor Zabala
Chorus: José Luis Pagan, Dorita Chávez

Recorded: Mobile Studios, Buenos Aires; Ultra Pop Studios, Miami; Pink Caos Recording Studios, Miami; Caribbean Recording Studio, Puerto Rico
Engineers: Gustavo 'Pichón' Dal Pont, Cirilo Rodulfo, José Luis Pagán, Marlow Rosado, Víctor Sonny Hernández
Mixing: José Luis Pagán, Ultra Pop Studios, Miami
Mastering: Antonio Baglio, Nautilus Mastering, Italy
Art Direction: Sonia Valentín
Graphic Design: José Manuel Díaz
Photography: Eric Stella
Hair & Make-up: Miguel Angel Marrero

DVD Music Video track listing

Notes

Track listing and credits from album booklet.

Remixes

Charts

Singles Charts

References

Yolandita Monge albums
2007 albums